Keeler is a special service area in the Canadian province of Saskatchewan within the Rural Municipality of Marquis No. 191 and Census Division No. 7. It held village status prior to 2021.

History 
Keeler incorporated as a village on July 5, 1910. It relinquished its village status on December 31, 2020, becoming a special service area under the jurisdiction of the Rural Municipality of Marquis No. 191.

Demographics 

Notable people
 Maurine Stuart, one of the first female Zen masters to teach in the United States, was born and raised in Keeler.

See also 
 List of communities in Saskatchewan
 List of special service areas in Saskatchewan

Footnotes

Special service areas in Saskatchewan
Marquis No. 191, Saskatchewan
Division No. 7, Saskatchewan